Gavilon is a commodity management firm based in Omaha, Nebraska. The company is organized into two operating segments:

Operating segments

Grain & Ingredients – Gavilon originates, stores, and distributes grains and oilseeds, as well as   feed and food ingredients, to food manufacturers, livestock producers, poultry processors, soybean processors and ethanol producers worldwide.

Fertilizer – The company also partners with offshore suppliers and leverages its global logistics system to provide customers competitively priced fertilizer.

Gavilon uses the futures market to manage price risk associated with inventory positions and forward contracts.

History

The company’s history dates back to 1874, when Minneapolis-based Peavey Company built its first grain facility. In 1967 the Canadian operations began and later renamed as Peavey Mart. In 1982, Peavey was acquired by ConAgra Foods, Inc. and later became part of ConAgra Trade Group. In 1984 Peavey Mart was sold to the Canadian management team. In 2008, a group of investors formed Gavilon and acquired ConAgra Trade Group, enabling the privately held company to focus on growing its commodity business. In 2010, Gavilon acquired the DeBruce Companies, which significantly expanded the company’s agricultural operations. In 2013, Marubeni Corporation, one of the largest general trading companies in Japan, purchased the company's agriculture assets and businesses. Later that year, Gavilon's energy business was sold to NGL Energy Partners LP (NYSE: NGL).

Today, Gavilon employs 2,000 people around the world and is the second largest grain handler in North America based on storage capacity.

In 2022, Gavilon was purchased by Viterra for $1.1 billion. It is expected Gavilon will be fulling integrated in Viterra by early 2023.

Bee Branch Mussel Killing 
On June 18, 2020, Gavilon Grain spilled a million gallon container of liquid nitrogen fertilizer into the Bee Branch. The accident was caused by a mistake transferring nitrogen, with the receiving tank overfilling. The transfer was not being watched nor was the spill immediately reported.  This severely damaged the mussel population, causing the largest mussel kill in the state. The company was fined $270,000. The largest fine of $244,705 was issued to restore giant floater and plain pocketbook mussels.

References

External links 

Privately held companies based in Nebraska
Grain companies of the United States